Bilgadi (Bilhədi) is a rural locality (a selo) in Chinarsky Selsoviet, Derbentsky District, Republic of Dagestan, Russia. The population was 635 as of 2010. The village has an Azerbaijani-majority.

Geography 
Bilgadi is located 17 km northwest of Derbent (the district's administrative centre) by road. Chinar and Zidyan-Kazmalyar are the nearest rural localities.

References 

Rural localities in Derbentsky District